Yonah Lewis (born March 2, 1986) is a Canadian film director and screenwriter, who collaborates on most of his work with Calvin Thomas. The duo are most noted for their 2019 film White Lie, which was a Canadian Screen Award nominee for Best Motion Picture, and garnered the duo nominations for Best Director and Best Original Screenplay, at the 8th Canadian Screen Awards.

The duo, both alumni of Sheridan College, released their debut feature film Amy George in 2011. They followed up with The Oxbow Cure in 2013, and Spice It Up in 2018, before releasing White Lie. In addition to their Canadian Screen Award nominations, the duo also won the Vancouver Film Critics Circle award for Best Screenplay for a Canadian Film in 2019.

Filmography

References

External links

1986 births
21st-century Canadian screenwriters
Film directors from Montreal
Canadian male screenwriters
Sheridan College alumni
Living people
Writers from Montreal
Jewish Canadian writers
Jewish Canadian filmmakers